Priozerny is a rural locality (a settlement) in Kuybyshevsky Selsoviet, Rubtsovsky District, Altai Krai, Russia. The population was 385 as of 2013. There are 9 streets.

Geography 
Priozerny is located 10 km north of Rubtsovsk (the district's administrative centre) by road. Opytny is the nearest rural locality.

References 

Rural localities in Rubtsovsky District